Chymomyza procnemoides is a species of fruit fly in the family Drosophilidae. It is found in Europe.

References

Drosophilidae
Articles created by Qbugbot
Insects described in 1952